The autumn period of the fighting for East Prussia was associated primarily with new operations by the armies of the Central Powers on the Vistula and San. The heavy defeat of the Austro-Hungarian troops in the Battle of Galicia, their hasty retreat to the Carpathians and Krakow created the threat of the Russian troops seizing Silesia, an important industrial region of Germany. To transfer the severity of operations to the threatened direction, it was necessary to create a new army (9th Army) from the available forces, which was done by the Germans in mid-September 1914.

Under these conditions, the 8th Army was entrusted with the task of preventing a new Russian invasion of East Prussia and at the same time tying up as many Russian troops as possible in stubborn battles, preventing them from being transferred to Warsaw or the San River, for which it was necessary to curtail operations in the large bend of the Neman and on the Bobr River. Taking into account the fact that the number of opposing Russian troops did not decrease compared to August due to the introduction of the new 10th Army and secondary divisions into battle, the task of defending East Prussia with limited forces became more complicated. Nevertheless, despite the change of command and the withdrawal of troops to the state border, until the beginning of November, the German troops successfully held back the Russian onslaught and delivered sensitive counterattacks. The only negative was the attraction to the province of another newly formed corps, which could be used in the Warsaw direction.

The Russian armies of the North-Western Front were assigned several tasks that changed over time. Until the end of September, the main goal was to stop the invasion of German troops into Russia, including preventing them from crossing the Bobr and Neman rivers, as well as to release and send the largest number of troops to Warsaw. This task was successfully completed, to the middle Vistula, along with the control of the 2nd Army (until September 15 was at the disposal of the headquarters of the armies of the Southwestern Front) four army corps were sent (8 infantry divisions and a rifle brigade), the Germans were ousted from Russian territory.

With the start of the fighting near Warsaw, the 1st and 10th Russian armies were supposed to launch a new invasion of East Prussia and go to Königsberg, but the offensive on Lötzen and Marggrabowa of the Russian 10th army and on Insterburg of the Russian 1st army failed, the troops suffered serious losses. A new task was the active defense of the strip along the state border in order to prevent the strengthening of the Germans grouping on the middle Vistula. Having completed the tasks, it was made easier by the desire of Hermann von François to consolidate success in defensive battles with a new victorious offensive towards the Neman. But the terrain was difficult and well prepared for defense, the Russian troops maintained a significant superiority in strength and defended their positions.

The retreat of the German troops to a fortified position behind the border and the sending of significant reinforcements to the 9th German Army did not lead to a new idea of ​​​​a broad offensive: now the advance of the Russian troops in East Prussia had a clearly expressed subordinate character in relation to the main operation in the Berlin direction.

In general, until the end of September 1914, the Russian command of the armies of the North-Western Front was able to restore strength after the defeat near Tannenberg and Masurian Lakes, create a powerful grouping and threaten East Prussia, chaining significant forces of the German 8th Army to this area in October 1914 . The Germans had to leave the banks of the Neman, Augustow and Suwalki. Moreover, a new offensive was organized within Germany. However, the Russian troops failed to conquer the province: also using reinforcements, the German side was able not only to stop the troops of the 1st and 10th armies, but also inflict serious defeats on the flank groups and go on the offensive, which lasted until November. However, the Russian troops had sufficient forces to repel frontal attacks and again force the Germans to withdraw to East Prussia.

In early November, the Russian armies maintained a numerical superiority, but the Germans's transition to new defensive tactics made it possible to release five infantry divisions for the operation against Łódź without prejudice to the defense of the province. Turning to the tactics of creating well-fortified zones, the German troops of the 8th Army by mid-November 1914 stopped the advance of the Russian 10th Army and forced it to also go on the defensive.

See also 
 1st Russian invasion of East Prussia

References 

Eastern Front (World War I)